Stephanie Jayne "Steph" Cook, MBE (born 7 February 1972) is a British retired modern pentathlete. She was the Olympic champion at this event in 2000.

Cook was born in Irvine, North Ayrshire, Scotland. She was educated at Bedford High School; The Perse School for Girls; Peterhouse, Cambridge and then Lincoln College, Oxford, where she read medicine.

Having rowed at Cambridge, she took up modern pentathlon whilst completing her course in clinical medicine at Oxford. She was president of the Oxford University Modern Pentathlon Association in 1995–1996, and won the women's individual title in the Varsity match against Cambridge in 1997.

Although reported as "having put her medical career on hold", she was supported through her training from 1998 to 2000 by Consultant Surgeon Mark Whiteley who funded a research job for her in Guildford, during which she published three papers with him. She paid him tribute in 2002 during the TV programme This is Your Life.

Cook won the gold medal in the Sydney 2000 Olympics in the women's modern pentathlon, the first time that the event was included in the games. She went on to win individual World and European titles in 2001 before retiring from the sport. Her particular strength was running.

Honours 
In the 2001 New Year Honours, Cook was appointed as a member of the Order of The British Empire for services to modern pentathlon. In 2008, she was awarded an honorary degree (Doctor of Medicine) from the University of Bath.

References

External links
 

1972 births
Living people
Sportspeople from Irvine, North Ayrshire
Alumni of Peterhouse, Cambridge
Alumni of Lincoln College, Oxford
Anglo-Scots
Officers of the Order of the British Empire
British female modern pentathletes
Olympic modern pentathletes of Great Britain
Modern pentathletes at the 2000 Summer Olympics
Olympic gold medallists for Great Britain
Olympic medalists in modern pentathlon
People educated at Bedford High School, Bedfordshire
People educated at the Perse School for Girls
Scottish Olympic medallists
Medalists at the 2000 Summer Olympics
Members of the Order of the British Empire
Team Bath pentathletes